Wang Deshun (born August 20, 1936) is a Chinese model and film actor. He got nicknamed the Hottest Grandpa in China after walking shirtless in Beijing Fashion Week in 2015.

Career 
In 1960, Wang Deshun joined the Shenyang Military Region Anti-Enemy Drama Troupe and became a drama actor. In 1970, Wang Deshun, who had been a drama actor for 10 years in the Anti-Enemy Drama Troupe of the Shenyang Military Region, was assigned to the Changchun Drama Theater after demobilization.

In April 1985, he participated in the International Brecht System Symposium held by the Central Academy of Drama in Beijing, and performed the pantomime "Man and Snake". In the same year, Wang Deshun created the only type of pantomime in the world called "Model Pantomime".

In 1987, he was sent by the Ministry of Culture to participate in the 12th International Mime Festival held in Cologne, Federal Germany, which pushed Chinese mime to the international mime stage for the first time.

In 1989, went to Macau to participate in the "Macao New Year International Art Festival". In the same year, Wang Deshun's modeling pantomime was included in the drama volume of "Encyclopedia of China".

In 1993, Wang Deshun was invited by France to participate in the 8th International Theater Festival in Orias, France.

In 1994, participated in the first Shanghai International Mime Festival. "Modeling Pantomime" became the only pantomime show in China in this session. In the same year, Wang Deshun's artistic creation of "Picture Pantomime" was included in "Picture China's Hundred Years History".

In 1995, participated in the Impulse Art Festival in Austria. In the same year, Wang Deshun's modeling pantomime and his name were included in the "List of World Famous People" published by the American Biographical Association.

Since then he has been acting in many films but received global recognition on March 25, 2015, Wang Deshun participated in the 2015 autumn and winter fashion released by designer Hu Sheguang at the International Fashion Week at the 798 Art Center in Beijing. 

In 2017 he became the brand ambassador for Reebok.

Personal life 
He is married with two kids and a granddaughter.

On August 20, 2021, the 85-year-old Wang Deshun broke through many "hurdles". It took only 3 months to complete all flight subjects at Miyun Mujiayu Airport, successfully received his pilot's license, and realized his blue sky dream.

Filmography

Television Series

Films

Variety Shows

Dubbing

Awards and Nominations

References

External links 
 
 

1936 births
Living people
Chinese male models
Chinese male film actors
Chinese male television actors
Male actors from Shenyang
20th-century Chinese male actors
21st-century Chinese male actors